The Gandhavamsa (lit. History of Literature; also Cullagandhavamsa) is a volume of 17th century Pali literature by Nandapañña that describes the post-canonical Pali literature of Burma and Ceylon.

References
Norman, K. R. (1983). A History of Indian Literature vol. VII: Pali Literature (J. Gonda, Ed.). Otto Harrassowitz. pp. 180-81 

Pali Buddhist texts
17th-century Indian books